An 802.15.4 radio module is a small device used to communicate wirelessly with other devices according to the IEEE 802.15.4 protocol.

This table lists production ready-to-use certified modules only, not radio chips. A ready-to-use module is a complete system with a transceiver, and optionally an MCU and antenna on a printed circuit board. While most of the modules in this list are Zigbee, Thread, ISA100.11a, or WirelessHART modules, some don't contain enough flash memory to implement a Zigbee stack and instead run plain 802.15.4 protocol, sometimes with a lighter wireless protocol on top.

Transceiver-only modules 

These modules only include the RF transceiver and do not include a microprocessor. As a result, the protocol stack will need to be handled by an external IC. They are lower in price than modules which contain a microprocessor and enable the integrator to choose any microprocessor. However, potentially more work is required for integrating the MCU and module.

The following table lists vendor by alphabetical order:

Integrated MCU and transceiver modules 
The following table lists vendor by alphabetical order:

List of Zigbee company acquisitions 

 2016, Apr - Cypress acquires Broadcom's IoT Business
 2016, Jan - Silicon Labs acquires Telegesis
 2016, Jan - Microchip acquires Atmel
 2015, Dec - NXP acquires Freescale Semiconductor
 2012, Jul - Murata acquires RF
 2012, May - Silicon Labs acquires Ember
 2011, Dec - Linear technology acquires Dust Networks
 2010, Jul - NXP acquires Jennic
 2009, Feb - Atmel acquires Meshnetics
 2008, Nov - Telit acquires One RF technology
 2007, Aug - Texas Instruments acquires Integrated Circuit Designs
 2006, Jan - Texas Instruments acquires Chipcon (intention announced 2005–10 but deal completed 2006-01-24)
 2005, Jan - Chipcon acquires Figure 8

Other companies manufacturing 802.15.4 ready-to-use modules 

The following is a list of companies producing modules yet to be added to the table.
 Adaptive Network Solutions (Atmel chipset at 900 MHz)
 Air Micro (RadioPulse chipset)
 Develco
 Develco Products
 Joymax (Jennic chipset)
 LS Research ProFLEX01, SiFLEX02
 Merlin Wireless (Ember chipset)
 Spectec (TI chipset)
 Synapse Wireless
 Telit (TI Chipset, TinyOne 2400MC, ZE50-2.4, ZE60-2.4)
 UConnect (TI Chipset)
 ZMDI (ZMDI chipset at 900 MHz)

References 

IEEE 802
Personal area networks
Wireless networking